Buckfastleigh is a market town and civil parish in Devon, England situated beside the Devon Expressway (A38) at the edge of the Dartmoor National Park. It is part of Teignbridge and, for ecclesiastical purposes, lies within the Totnes Deanery. It is 18 miles (29 km) east-northeast of Plymouth, 20 miles (32 km) southwest of Exeter and has a population of 3,661. It is a centre of tourism and is home to Buckfast Abbey, the South Devon Railway, the Buckfastleigh Butterfly Farm and Otter Sanctuary, the Tomb of Squire Richard Cabell and The Valiant Soldier.

With 13 letters, Buckfastleigh is one of the longest place names in England with no repeated letters, tied with Buslingthorpe, Leeds and Buslingthorpe, Lincolnshire, but exceeded by Bricklehampton in Worcestershire with 14 letters.

Geography
Geographically, Buckfastleigh straddles the confluence of two small streams from Dartmoor which feed into the River Dart just to the east of the town. About one mile to the north lies Buckfast, home of Buckfast Abbey. To the northwest lie Holne and Scorriton on the southern breastwork of the Dartmoor upland. Pridhamsleigh Cavern is nearby and is neighboured by Ashburton and Lower Dean.

History
Historically Buckfastleigh has grown as a mill town known for its woollen mills, corn and paper mills and a tannery supported by the rivers Dart, Mardle and the Dean Burn – water being an essential natural resource used in the manufacturing of wool and other products.

Buckfastleigh is medieval in origin, as is still evident in the original layout of the town. By the seventeenth century, most of the properties had been rebuilt, but the medieval layout, particularly in Fore Street, is still visible today.

The name "Buckfast" means "stronghold" – traditionally a place where deer and buck were held, and "Leigh" would have been the pasture belonging to Buckfast – hence the meaning deer held in a pasture (buck-fast-leigh).

Buckfast probably existed before Buckfastleigh as it is mentioned in the Domesday Book and in 1018 a Benedictine Abbey was founded and endorsed by King Canute at Buckfast.

Buckfastleigh town centre is now an area of mostly late eighteenth- to early twentieth-century buildings with an interesting collection of private dwellings, commercial and retail properties and public houses which retain many, if not all, of their original features, styles and character.

The town centre during the first half of the twentieth century was a lively almost self-sufficient community with locally based employment and a large building programme of local authority housing initiated by Buckfastleigh Urban District Council which commenced in the 1920s and extended the town to the south west and the north west. Census data shows that in 1801 the population was 1,525, and 2,781 in 1901.

The most prominent benefactors of the town were the Hamlyn family . who were the original owners of the woollen mills up until 1920 and together with other philanthropists in the town, new cottages were erected. In 1887 they were instrumental in the building of a new Town Hall and community building to celebrate the Golden Jubilee of Queen Victoria. Land was also made available at this time for further public facilities which included Victoria Park, the tennis courts and the swimming pool. The new primary school was built in 1875 and the railway line from Buckfastleigh and Ashburton to Totnes was opened.

Pennywell Farm is an organic farm and tourist attraction just outside the town.

Brook manor house and Sherlock Holmes
To the west of the town is the manor house of Brook, a grade II* listed building, built in 1656 by Richard Cabell (d.1677), lord of the manor of Brook. He was the subject of a local legend which relates that on the night of his death, black hounds breathing fire and smoke raced over Dartmoor and surrounded Brook House, howling. Cabell's unusual tomb was allegedly designed to keep his restless spirit from roaming Dartmoor. Sir Arthur Conan Doyle based his Sherlock Holmes novel The Hound of the Baskervilles (1901-1902) on this legend. The story's description of Baskerville Hall, however, is based on Cromer Hall in Norfolk.

South Devon Railway Trust
The South Devon Railway Trust is a charitable organisation that operates a heritage railway from Totnes to Buckfastleigh in Devon, alongside the River Dart. The heritage railway itself is known as the South Devon Railway, named in honour of the South Devon Railway Company that originally built much of Devon's railway infrastructure, although its previous name of the Dart Valley Railway is sometimes still heard.

The line was built by the Buckfastleigh, Totnes and South Devon Railway and first opened on 1 May 1872. Originally the line connected Totnes with Ashburton but in recent years the line passing between Buckfastleigh and Ashburton was demolished to make way for the A38 expressway. The line was worked by the larger South Devon Railway Company until 1 February 1876 when this was amalgamated into the Great Western Railway.

Vintage steam locomotives and carriages in the tradition of a bygone age are used; it offers unique scenery only seen from the railway. The South Devon Railway has an interesting collection of both steam and diesel locomotives. There are many former Great Western engines and industrial locomotives, the South Devon Railway Trust work with National Railway Museum.

Buckfast Abbey
Buckfast Abbey was founded by Earl Aylward in the reign of King Canute in 1018. In 1147 it became a Cistercian abbey and was rebuilt in stone. In medieval times, the abbey became rich through fishing and trading in sheep wool, although the Black Death killed two abbots and many monks – by 1377 there were only fourteen monks at Buckfast.

On 25 February 1539, William Petre arrived at Buckfast and declared the abbey to be dissolved by the order of King Henry VIII. The Dissolution of the Monasteries left monks compelled to leave and the buildings were looted and then destroyed. The abbey then stood in ruins for over two hundred years.

On 28 October 1882, six Benedictine monks arrived at Buckfast having been exiled from France. The land had been leased by monks from the St. Augustine's Priory in Ramsgate and it was later bought for £4,700. The first new abbot was Boniface Natter, who died in a shipwreck in 1906. His travelling companion Anscar Vonier became the next abbot and pledged to fulfil his dying wish, namely to rebuild the abbey.

Buckfastleigh Rangers Football and Social Club
Buckfastleigh Rangers is a Football and Social Club based in Buckfastleigh, Devon.  They were established in 1903, playing in the South Devon League. During recent years Rangers has enjoyed league promotion and cup success. The teams have won the Lidstone, Greenaway, Harry Treeby and the Devon Senior Cups.  Over the years Buckfastleigh Rangers Football Club have played hosts to other league clubs including Torquay United, Plymouth Argyle, Watford F.C and Leyton Orient.

From Buckfastleigh
Through the ages several residents of Buckfastleigh families have earned a place in history, scholarship or commerce. One such person is Professor William Hosking, who became, in 1840, the first Professor of Architecture at King's College in London.

The curly-coated Devon Rex cat breed was first discovered in Buckfastleigh in the 1960s and is named after the county in which the town is situated.

Caves
Buckfastleigh is famous for the following major caves:
 Bakers Pit
 Joint Mitnor Cave (containing unfossilised remains of bison, hippopotamus, hyaena, elephant and others)
 Reed's Cave

References

 
Towns in Devon
Market towns in Devon
Teignbridge